The Picayune School District is a public school district based in Picayune, Mississippi (USA).

The district is located in southwestern Pearl River County and extends into a small portion of Hancock County.

The superintendent is Dean Shaw. The assistant superintendent is Esslinger.

Schools

High school
Picayune Memorial High School (9-12)

Junior high school
Picayune Junior High School (7-8)

Elementary schools
Nicholson Elementary School (K-6)
Roseland Park Elementary School (K-6)
South Side Upper Elementary School (K-3)
South Side Lower Elementary School (4-6)
West Side Elementary School (K-6)

Other Schools
Early Head Start
Center for Alternative Education

Demographics

2006-07 school year
There were a total of 3,808 students enrolled in the Picayune School District during the 2006–2007 school year. The gender makeup of the district was 49% female and 51% male. The racial makeup of the district was 30.17% African American, 66.44% White, 2.63% Hispanic, 0.42% Asian, and 0.34% Native American. 54.3% of the district's students were eligible to receive free lunch.

Previous school years

Accountability statistics

See also
List of school districts in Mississippi

References

External links
 

Education in Pearl River County, Mississippi
Education in Hancock County, Mississippi
School districts in Mississippi